A list of notable jump horse races which take place annually in France, under the authority of France Galop, including all events which presently hold Group 1, 2 or 3 status.

Group 1

Group 2

Group 3

Selected other races

References
 galop.courses-france.com – "Palmarès des grandes courses d'obstacles en France".

Horse racing in France
 List of French jump horse races
horse